The 2022 Murray State Racers football team represent Murray State University  as a member of the Ohio Valley Conference (OVC) during the 2022 NCAA Division I FCS football season. They are led by third-year head coach Dean Hood and play their games at Roy Stewart Stadium in Murray, Kentucky.

Previous season

The Racers finished the 2021 season 6–5, 3–3 in OVC play to finish in a tie for fourth place.

Schedule

Game summaries

at Texas Tech

Jacksonville State

at Ball State

Eastern Illinois

at No. 21 Southeastern Louisiana

No. 18 UT Martin

at No. 24 Austin Peay

at Lindenwood

Tennessee State

Robert Morris

at No. 17 Southeast Missouri State

References

Murray State
Murray State Racers football seasons
Murray State Racers football